Chlifa is a  local authority  in the Baalbek District of the Baalbek-Hermel Governorate in Lebanon.

Chlifa has a dry climate, in the summer temperatures reach 35 °C+ and in the winter they reach a -5 °C in January. They reach a moderate temperature in the autumn and spring (not over 20 °C).

This village has an old Roman palace located on the mountain between Btadhi and Chlifa.

Chlifa has a population of a few hundred people. It is well know for its fruit harvest, particularly the red dates. Other crops include apples, figs, cherries, peaches.

The village is full of life and its famous in the area for having seven churches, indicating its strictly Christian population.

History
In 1838, Eli Smith noted Shelifa's population as being predominantly  Catholic and "Greek" Christians.

References

Bibliography

External links
Chlifa, localiban

Populated places in Baalbek District